African Americans have served in state legislatures, with several interruptions, since Alexander Twilight was elected to the Vermont lower house in 1836. One state (out of 50) has yet to elect or appoint any African-American state legislators: North Dakota.

Nationwide

Alabama

Alaska

Arkansas

Arizona

California

Colorado

Connecticut

Delaware

Florida
 First African-American woman elected to the Florida House of Representatives: Gwen Cherry (1970)
 first woman in the Senate: Carrie Meek (1980)
 First African-American man elected to the House since Reconstruction: Joe Lang Kershaw (1968)
 first African-American man elected to the Senate: Arnett E. Girardeau (1982)

Georgia
 first 33 African-American legislators in Georgia: see Original 33 (1868)
 first African-American woman elected to the House: Grace Towns Hamilton (1966)
 first African-American woman elected to the Georgia Senate: Nadine Thomas (1992)
 first African-American man elected to the Georgia Senate since 1874: Leroy Johnson (1963)
 first African-American man to serve as majority leader of the state senate: Charles Walker (1996)

Hawaii
 first African-American woman elected to the Hawaii House of Representatives and Hawaii Senate: Charles Campbell (1976; 1978)

Idaho
 first African-American elected to the Idaho House of Representatives: Cherie Buckner-Webb (2010)
 first African-American elected to the Idaho Senate:  Cherie Buckner-Webb (2012)

Illinois
 first African American elected to the Illinois General Assembly: John W. E. Thomas (1876)
 first African-American elected to the Illinois Senate: Adelbert H. Roberts (1924)
 first African-American woman elected to the Illinois General Assembly: Floy Clements (1958)
 first African-American woman elected to the Illinois Senate: Earlean Collins (1977)

Indiana
 first African-American man elected to the Indiana House of Representatives: James Sidney Hinton (1880)
 first African-American woman elected to the Indiana House of Representatives: Daisy Riley Lloyd (1964)
 first African-American man elected to the Indiana Senate: Robert Brokenburr (1940)
 first African-American woman elected to the Indiana Senate: Julia Carson (1977)

Iowa
 first African-American elected to the Iowa Senate: Thomas Mann (1983)
 first African-American woman elected to either house of the Iowa Assembly, Iowa House of Representatives: Willie Glanton (1964)

Kansas
 first African-American man elected to the Kansas House of Representatives: Alfred Fairfax (1888)
 first African-American woman elected to the Kansas House of Representatives: Barbara Ballard (1993)
 first African-American men elected to the Kansas Senate: Curtis McClinton Sr. and George Haley (1960)
 first African-American woman elected to the Kansas Senate: Oletha Faust-Goudeau (2008)

Kentucky
 first African-American man elected to the Kentucky House of Representatives: Charles W. Anderson (1936)
 first African-American woman elected to the Kentucky House of Representatives: Amelia Tucker (1961)
 first African-American (and first woman) elected to the Kentucky Senate: Georgia Davis Powers (1968)

Louisiana
 first African-American elected to the Louisiana House of Representatives since Reconstruction: Ernest "Dutch" Morial (1969) 
first African-American elected to the Louisiana Senate since Reconstruction: Sidney Barthelemy (1976)

Maine
 first African-American elected to the Maine Senate: John Jenkins (1996)

Maryland
 first African-American elected to the Maryland Assembly: Mathias de Sousa (1641)
 first African-American women elected to the Maryland General Assembly: Verda F. Welcome and Irma George Dixon (1958)

Massachusetts
 first African-American men elected to the Massachusetts House of Representatives: Edward G. Walker and Charles L. Mitchell (1866)
 first African-American woman elected to the Massachusetts House of Representatives: Doris Bunte (1973)
 first African-American man elected to the Massachusetts Senate: Bill Owens (1975)

Michigan
 first African-American woman to be elected to the Michigan Legislature: Charline White (1950)
 first African-American woman elected to Michigan Senate: Cora Brown (1952)
 first African-American man elected to Michigan Senate: Charles A. Roxborough (1930)
 first African-American man elected to Michigan House of Representatives: William Webb Ferguson (1893)

Minnesota
 first African-American man elected to the Minnesota House of Representatives: John Francis Wheaton (1898)
 first African-American woman elected to the Minnesota House of Representatives: Neva Walker (2001)
 first African-American man elected to the Minnesota Senate: B. Robert Lewis (1972)

Mississippi
 first African-American male member of the House: John R. Lynch (1869)
 first African-American Speaker of the House: John R. Lynch (1873)
 first African-American elected to the state legislature since Reconstruction: Robert G. Clark, Jr. (1967)
 first African-American woman to be elected to the House: Alyce Clarke (1985)
 first African-American woman to be elected to the Senate: Alice Harden (1988)
 first African-American male Senator since Reconstruction: Arthur Tate (1979)

Missouri
 first African-American male member of the House: Walthall M. Moore (1921)
 first African-American female member of the House: DeVerne Lee Calloway (1962)
 first African-American male member of the Missouri Senate: Ted McNeal (1960)
 first African-American female member of the Missouri Senate: Gwen B. Giles (1977)

Montana

 first African-American woman elected to the Montana Legislature: Geraldine W. Travis (1974)

Nebraska
 first African-American man elected to the unicameral Nebraska Legislature: John Adams Jr. (1937)
 first African-American woman appointed to the Nebraska Legislature: JoAnn Maxey (1977)
 first African-American women elected to the Nebraska Legislature: Tanya Cook and Brenda Council (2009)
 first African-American man elected to the former Nebraska House of Representatives: Matthew Ricketts (1893)

Nevada
 first African-American man elected to the Nevada Senate: Joe Neal (1972)
 first African-American woman elected to the Nevada Senate: Bernice Mathews (1994)
 first African-American man elected to the Nevada Assembly: Woodrow Wilson (1966)
 first African-American woman elected to the Nevada Assembly: Dina Neal (2011)

New Hampshire
 first African-American man elected to the New Hampshire House of Representatives: Henry B. Richardson (1974)

New Jersey
 first African-American man elected to the New Jersey General Assembly: Walter G. Alexander I (1920)
 first African-American woman elected to the New Jersey General Assembly: Madaline A. Williams (1957)
 first African-American man to serve as Speaker of the General Assembly: Walter G. Alexander I (1921)
 first African-American man elected as Speaker of the General Assembly: S. Howard Woodson (1974)

New Mexico
 first African-American woman elected to the New Mexico House of Representatives: Sheryl Williams Stapleton (1995)

New York
 first African-American man elected to the New York State Assembly: Edward A. Johnson (1917)
 first African-American man elected to the New York State Senate: Julius A. Archibald (1953)
 first African-American woman elected to the New York State Assembly: Bessie A. Buchanan (1955)
 first African-American woman elected to the New York State Senate: Constance Baker Motley (1964)
 first African-American elected Speaker of the New York State Assembly: Carl Heastie (2015)

North Carolina
 first African-American man elected to the North Carolina House of Representatives: Hanson T. Hughes (1866)
 first African-American woman elected to the North Carolina House of Representatives: Annie Brown Kennedy (1979)
 first African-American men elected to the North Carolina Senate: John R. Bryant (1866)
 first African-American woman to serve in the North Carolina Senate: Jeanne Hopkins Lucas (1993, appointed and re-elected)

Ohio
 first African-American man elected to the Ohio Senate: John Patterson Green (1892)
 first African-American man elected to the Ohio House of Representatives: George Washington Williams (1880)
 first African-American woman elected to the Ohio House of Representatives: Helen Rankin (1978)
 first African-American woman elected to the Ohio Senate: Rhine McLin (1994)

Oklahoma
 first African-American male member of the Oklahoma Senate: E. Melvin Porter (1965)
 first African-American female member of the Oklahoma Senate: Maxine Horner (1987)
 first African-American male member of the Oklahoma House of Representatives: A. C. Hamlin (1908)
 first African-American female member of the Oklahoma House of Representatives: Hannah Diggs Atkins (1968)
 first black speaker of the House: T.W. Shannon (2013)

Oregon
 first African-American woman elected to the Oregon House of Representatives: Margaret Carter (1985)
 first African-American woman elected to the Oregon Senate: Avel Gordly (1996)
 first African-American man elected to the Oregon House of Representatives: Bill McCoy (1972)

Pennsylvania
 first African-American man to be elected to the Pennsylvania House of Representatives: Harry W. Bass (1911)
 first African-American woman to be elected to the Pennsylvania House of Representatives: Crystal Bird Fauset (1938)
 first African-American man to be elected to the Pennsylvania Senate: Herbert Arlene (1967)
 first African-American woman to be elected to the Pennsylvania Senate: Roxanne Jones (1985)
 first African-American speaker of the House: K. Leroy Irvis (1977)
 first African-American woman speaker of the House: Joanna McClinton (2023)

Rhode Island
 first African-American to be elected to the Rhode Island General Assembly: Rev. Mahlon Van Horne (1885)

South Carolina
 first African-American woman elected to the South Carolina House of Representatives: Juanita Goggins (1975)
 first African-American man elected to the South Carolina Senate (since Reconstruction): Isaiah DeQuincey Newman (1983)
 first African-American woman elected to the South Carolina Senate: Maggie Wallace Glover (1992)

South Dakota
 first African-American man elected to the South Dakota House of Representatives: Tony Randolph (2018)

Tennessee
 first African American elected to the Tennessee House of Representatives: Sampson W. Keeble (1873)
 first African-American woman elected to the Tennessee House of Representatives: Dorothy Lavinia Brown (1966)
 first African-American men elected to the Tennessee Senate: Avon Williams and J. O. Patterson Jr. (1969)
 first African-American woman elected to the Tennessee Senate: Thelma Harper (1991)

Texas
 first African-American men elected to the Texas Senate: George T. Ruby and Matt Gaines (1869)
 first African-American men elected to the Texas House of Representatives: 14 men (1869)
 first African-American woman elected to the Texas Senate: Barbara Jordan (1966)
 first African-American women elected to the Texas House of Representatives: Senfronia Thompson and Eddie Bernice Johnson (1973)

Utah
 first African-American elected to the Utah Senate: Terry Williams (1981)
 first African-American woman elected to the Utah Legislature: Sandra Hollins (2015)

Vermont

 first African-American man elected to Vermont House of Representatives: Alexander Twilight (1836)
 first African-American woman elected to Vermont House of Representatives: Louvenia Bright (1988)

Virginia
 Six African-American men were elected to serve in the Virginia Senate in 1869: James W. D. Bland, Isaiah L. Lyons, William P. Moseley, Francis “Frank” Moss, John Robinson, and George Teamoh.  
 First African-American woman to be elected to the Virginia Senate: Yvonne B. Miller (1988)
 Twenty four African-American men were elected to serve in the Virginia House of Delegates in 1869: William H. Brisby, Henry Cox, Isaac Edmundson, Ballard T. Edwards, George Fayerman, Ross Hamilton, Charles E. Hodges, John Q. Hodges, Benjamin F. Jones, Peter K. Jones, Robert G. W. Jones, James F. Lipscomb, J. B. Miller Jr., Peter G. Morgan, F. S. Norton, Robert Norton, Alexander Owen, Caesar Perkins, Fountain M. Perkins, William H. Ragsdale, George Lewis Seaton, William N. Stevens, John Watson, and Ellis Wilson. 
 First African-American woman to be elected to the Virginia House of Delegates: Yvonne B. Miller (1984)

Washington
 first African-American man to be elected to the Washington Legislature: William Owen Bush (1889)
 first African-American man to be elected to the Washington State Senate: John H. Ryan (1933)
 first African-American woman to be appointed to the Washington State Legislature: Marjorie Pitter-King (1965)
 first African-American woman elected to the Washington Legislature: Peggy Maxie (1971)
 first African-American woman appointed to the Washington State Senate: Rosa Franklin (1993)

Wisconsin
 first African-American man elected to the Wisconsin State Assembly: Lucian H. Palmer (1906)
 first African-American woman elected to the Wisconsin State Assembly: Marcia P. Coggs (1977)
 first African-American man elected to the Wisconsin Senate: Monroe Swan (1973)
 first African-American woman elected to the Wisconsin Senate: Gwen Moore (1993)

West Virginia
 first African-American man to be elected to the West Virginia House of Delegates: Christopher Payne (1886)
 first African-American woman to serve in the West Virginia House of Delegates: Minnie Buckingham Harper (appointed) (1928)
 first African-American woman to be elected to the West Virginia Senate: Marie Redd (1998)

Wyoming
 first African American elected to the Wyoming Legislature: William Jefferson Hardin (1879)
 first African-American woman elected to the Wyoming Legislature: Harriet Elizabeth Byrd (1988)

First speakers and caucus leaders
 Alabama
 Quinton Ross, (Senate, Minority)
 Anthony Daniel (House, Minority)
 Arizona
 Leah Landrum Taylor (Senate, Minority)
 California
 Willie Brown (Assembly, Speaker (male))
 Karen Bass (Assembly, Speaker (female))
 Colorado
 Terrance Carroll (Assembly, Speaker)
 Peter Groff (Senate, President)
 Georgia
 Charles Walker (Senate, Majority)
 Robert Brown (Senate, Minority)
 Stacey Abrams (House, Minority)
 Illinois
 Cecil A. Partee (Senate, President)
 Maryland
 Adrienne Jones (House, Speaker)
 Michigan
 Kwame Kilpatrick (House, Minority)
 Mississippi
 John R. Lynch (House, Speaker)
 New Jersey
 Walter G. Alexander I (Assembly, acting Speaker)
 S. Howard Woodson (Assembly, Speaker)
 New York
 Andrea Stewart-Cousins (Senate, Majority Leader)
 Carl Heastie (Assembly, Speaker)
 David Paterson (Senate, Minority)
 Ohio
 William L. Mallory Sr. (House, Majority (male))
 Tracy Maxwell Heard (House, Majority (female), Minority)
 Ben Espy (Senate, Minority (male))
 Rhine McLin (Senate, Minority (female))
 Jack Ford (House, Minority)
 Oklahoma
 T.W. Shannon (House, Speaker)
 Oregon
 Jackie Winters (Senate, Minority)
 Pennsylvania
 K. Leroy Irvis (House, Speaker)
 Joanna McClinton (House, Minority (female))
 Tennessee
 Karen Camper (House, Minority)
 Virginia
 Charniele Herring (House, Majority)

References

Lists of African-American people
Lists of firsts
African-American
African-American